Cebranopadol (developmental code GRT-6005) is an opioid analgesic of the benzenoid class which is currently under development internationally by Grünenthal, a German pharmaceutical company, and its partner Depomed, a pharmaceutical company in the United States, for the treatment of a variety of different acute and chronic pain states. As of November 2014, it is in phase III clinical trials.

Cebranopadol is unique in its mechanism of action as an opioid, binding to and activating all four of the opioid receptors; it acts as a full agonist of the μ-opioid receptor (Ki = 0.7 nM; EC50 = 1.2 nM; IA = 104%), and δ-opioid receptor (Ki = 18 nM; EC50 = 110 nM; IA = 105%), and as a partial agonist of the nociceptin receptor (Ki = 0.9 nM; EC50 = 13.0 nM;  = 89%) and κ-opioid receptor (Ki = 2.6 nM; EC50 = 17 nM; IA = 67%). The EC50 values of 0.5–5.6 µg/kg when introduced intravenously and 25.1 µg/kg after oral administration.

Cebranopadol shows highly potent and effective antinociceptive and antihypertensive effects in a variety of different animal models of pain. Notably, it has also been found to be more potent in models of chronic neuropathic pain than acute nociceptive pain compared to selective μ-opioid receptor agonists. Relative to morphine, tolerance to the analgesic effects of cebranopadol has been found to be delayed (26 days versus 11 days for complete tolerance). In addition, unlike morphine, cebranopadol has not been found to affect motor coordination or reduce respiration in animals at doses in or over the dosage range for analgesia. As such, it may have improved and prolonged efficaciousness and greater tolerability in comparison to currently available opioid analgesics.

As an agonist of the κ-opioid receptor, cebranopadol may have the capacity to produce psychotomimetic effects, dysphoria, and other adverse reactions at sufficiently high doses, a property which could potentially limit its practical clinical dosage range, but would likely reduce the occurrence of patients taking more than their prescribed dose.

See also
 List of investigational analgesics

References

External links
 Cebranopadol - AdisInsight
 Cebranopadol Search Results - ClinicalTrials.gov

Analgesics
Opioids
Arylcyclohexylamines
Indoles
Kappa-opioid receptor agonists
Mu-opioid receptor agonists
Delta-opioid receptor agonists
Nociceptin receptor agonists
Experimental drugs